Ramon Galloway (born February 10, 1991) is an American professional basketball player. He played college basketball for South Carolina and La Salle.

High school career
Galloway first attended Freire Charter High School for two seasons before transferring to William T. Dwyer High School where he averaged 17.7 points, 7.0 rebounds and 4.5 assists as a senior. After graduating, he was the No. 29 point guard by Scout.com while being ranked as a Rivals.com Top 150 prospect  and the No. 24 ranked point guard.

College career
Galloway played for two years at South Carolina averaging 10.7 points a game in his sophomore season, being the third leading scorer for the Gamecocks. Before entering his junior season, he transferred to La Salle. He received a hardship waiver from NCAA to compete immediately after transferring, and averaged 14.1 points, 4.0 rebounds, and 3.8 assists per game as a junior. Galloway was a Second Team All-Atlantic 10 and Second Team NABC All-District IV selection. In 34 games as a senior, he averaged 17.2 points, 4.6 rebounds. and 3.7 assists in 33.3 minutes, leading La Salle to the Sweet Sixteen in the 2013 NCAA Tournament. For his efforts, Galloway was named to the 2012–13 All-Atlantic 10 First Team.

Professional career
After going undrafted in the 2013 NBA draft, Galloway joined the Denver Nuggets for the 2013 NBA Summer League. On July 16, 2013, he signed with Igokea of the ABA League. On November 1, he parted ways with Igokea. In four league games, Galloway averaged three points and eight rebounds while in the Eurocup he averaged 7.0 points, two rebounds and 7.0 assists.

On November 6, 2013, Galloway signed with Skyliners Frankfurt of the German Bundesliga. On February 27, he re-signed with Frankfurt for the rest of the season. On April 26, he parted ways with Skyliners Frankfurt. In 24 games, he averaged 9.8 points, 2.5 rebounds and two assists in 25 minutes.

On September 23, 2014, Galloway signed with Derthona Tortona of the Italian Serie A2 for the rest of the season. He averaged 14.9 points, 4.7 rebounds and 3 assists per game in Derthona.

In July 2015, Galloway joined the Chicago Bulls for the 2015 NBA Summer League. On July 25, 2015, he signed with Openjobmetis Varese of the Italian Serie A. On February 4, 2016, he parted ways with Varese. In 10 games, he averaged 9.3 points, 3.6 rebounds, 2.4 assists and 1.6 steals.

On February 5, 2016, Galloway signed with Paffoni Omegna of the Italian Serie A2 for the rest of the season. in 10 games with Omegna, he averaged 14.9 points, 5.2 rebounds, 3.1 assists and 1.4 steals.

In July 2016, Galloway joined the Charlotte Hornets for the 2016 NBA Summer League. On October 21, 2016, he signed with the Orlando Magic, but was waived the next day. On October 29, he was acquired by the Erie BayHawks of the NBA Development League as an affiliate player of the Magic.

On January 20, 2017, Galloway signed with Turkish club TED Ankara Kolejliler for the rest of the 2016–17 season.

In October 2017, Galloway signed with Al Sadd Doha of the Qatari Basketball League. He left Al Sadd after appearing in two games. On January 25, 2018, he signed with Sporting Al Riyadi Beirut of the Lebanese Basketball League. Galloway signed with Mantarrayas de La Paz in Mexico on May 16, 2019. Galloway averaged 14.7 points, 3.7 rebounds, 2.3 assists and 1.5 steals per game. On June 18, he signed with Anibal Zahle of the Lebanese Basketball League. Galloway joined CPN in the Dominican Republic in 2020.

Personal life
The son of Karen Davis and Gerald Galloway Jr., he has nine siblings. He majored in criminal justice. He has two sons Ramon Jr. and youngest Cartier Galloway

References

External links
 La Salle Explorers bio
 South Carolina Gamecocks bio
 RealGM profile
 Sports-Reference profile

1991 births
Living people
American expatriate basketball people in Bosnia and Herzegovina
American expatriate basketball people in the Dominican Republic
American expatriate basketball people in Egypt
American expatriate basketball people in Germany
American expatriate basketball people in Italy
American expatriate basketball people in Lebanon
American expatriate basketball people in Mexico
American expatriate basketball people in Qatar
American expatriate basketball people in Turkey
Basketball players from Philadelphia
Erie BayHawks (2008–2017) players
Guards (basketball)
KK Igokea players
La Salle Explorers men's basketball players
Mantarrayas de La Paz players
Pallacanestro Varese players
South Carolina Gamecocks men's basketball players
TED Ankara Kolejliler players
American men's basketball players
Al Riyadi Club Beirut basketball players
American expatriate basketball people in Taiwan
Taiwan Beer basketball players
TaiwanBeer HeroBears players
T1 League imports
Al Ittihad Alexandria Club basketball players
Super Basketball League imports